"Sarajevo, ljubavi moja" is a single released by Bosnian singer-songwriter Kemal Monteno in 1976. The tune has in subsequent decades gained a cult following and is considered an evergreen homage to the city of Sarajevo.  Monteno had named the single his favorite, and the song was played at his funeral.

References

1976 songs
Pop songs
Culture in Sarajevo
Yugoslav songs
Bosnia and Herzegovina songs